The 2017 Missouri Valley Conference men's basketball tournament, popularly referred to as "Arch Madness", was the postseason men's basketball tournament that completed the 2016–17 season in the Missouri Valley Conference. The tournament was held at the Scottrade Center, now known as Enterprise Center, in St. Louis, Missouri from March 2–5, 2017. Wichita State defeated Illinois State in the championship game and earned the conference's automatic bid to the NCAA tournament.

This was the last MVC tournament for Wichita State, as it would leave its conference home of nearly 70 years to join the American Athletic Conference in July 2017.

Seeds
Teams were seeded by conference record, with ties broken by record between the tied teams followed by overall adjusted RPI, if necessary. The top six seeds received first-round byes.

Schedule

Tournament bracket

References

2016–17 Missouri Valley Conference men's basketball season
Missouri Valley Conference men's basketball tournament